Radio Saltire is a community radio station broadcasting primarily to East Lothian, Scotland on 106.7 & 107.2 FM and online.

The station is a charity registered in Scotland (SC044336).

The station is run by volunteers from across East Lothian and south-east Scotland.

In September 2013 they re-branded as Radio Saltire and moved to Tranent, East Lothian. In August 2014, they moved to their current premises at 5 Civic Square, Tranent.

Full details on shows and presenters can be found at www.radiosaltire.com

Radio Saltire has broadcasting licences from PRS for Music and the Phonographic Performance Limited (PPL) ensuring their legality and payment of royalties to performers.

References

External links
Official website

Internet radio stations in the United Kingdom
Tranent